The Middle East Policy Council (MEPC) is a Washington, D.C.-based 501(c)3 non-profit organization that produces analysis and commentary on issues impacting U.S. national interests in the Middle East. It was founded in 1981 under the stated mission to "expand public discussion and understanding of issues affecting U.S. policy in the Middle East."

MEPC was originally named the American Arab Affairs Council and was co-founded by journalist Richard Curtiss, who later founded the Washington Report on Middle East Affairs, and George Naifeh, who remained president of the MEPC until 1991. Subsequent presidents include George McGovern (1991-1997) and Charles W. Freeman Jr. (1997-2009). Frank Anderson was the president of the MEPC from 2009 to April 2012. Anderson served in the U.S. Central Intelligence Agency for 26 years. He served three tours of duty in the Middle East as an agency station chief, headed the Afghan Task Force (1987–89), and was chief of the Near East and South Asia Division. In late 2013 the MEPC board appointed Ford M. Fraker president. Following Fraker's death, Richard J. Schmierer was elected president of the council in 2017.

Programs 
The Council advances its mission through three programs: the quarterly journal Middle East Policy, the Capitol Hill Conference Series for policy makers and their staff, and professional development workshops for educators through the TeachMideast arm.

According to the Council web site:

"Fresh thinking and new insights have been our stock in trade from the beginning. The policy practitioners, analysts, economists and academics appearing in our venues have provided a wide diversity of views on the region stretching from Morocco to Afghanistan and from Central Asia to Oman.  They question conventional wisdom and explain complex issues without oversimplifying them."

Established in 1993, the Capitol Hill Conference Series is aimed at members of Congress and their staffs, opinion leaders and members of the media.  According to the Council web site "the starting point for each forum is the same: What are the interests of the United States in the Middle East, and how should they be realized?"

Recent Capitol Hill Conferences include:

 Changes and Challenges in Israeli & Palestinian Leadership (7/16/2021)
 The Impact of Climate Change on the Middle East (4/23/2021)
 Middle East Policy in Transition: Issues for the 117th Congress & New Administration (1/29/2021)
 Arab-Israeli Relations on the Eve of the U.S. Election (10/23/2020)
 Progress or Conflict? What to Expect for U.S. Policy in the Middle East (7/17/2020)
 The Middle East in 2020 (4/17/2020)
 U.S. - Iranian Confrontation: Domestic, Regional and Global Implications(1/17/2020)
 The United States, Israel, and Palestine: An Assessment (10/25/19)
 The United States - Saudi Arabian Relationship (7/19/19)
 The Future of U.S. Engagement in the Middle East (4/12/19)
 The Trump Administration's Middle East Policies: A Mid-term Assessment (1/25/19)

Video archives from these events are available on the MEPC website and the events are streamed live.

Since 1985, the workshops of TeachMideast have been conducted in nearly all fifty U.S. states, reaching over 20,000 teachers.

The Contributor Dialogue Series was introduced in spring of 2021 to explore Middle East Policy Journal articles through interviewing different authors of compelling pieces. Recent Contributor Dialogues include: 

 Permission to Narrate a Pandemic in Palestine (7/29/2021) Executive Director Bassima Alghussein interviews Bram Wispelwey, Rania Muhareb, Mads Gilbert and David Mills. 
 Iran's Regional Dynamics: A Piecemeal Approach (6/24/2021) Executive Director Bassima Alghussein interviews Dr. Banafsheh Keynoush.
 Democrats’ Attitudes toward the Israeli-Palestinian Conflict (5/20/2021) Executive Director Bassima Alghussein interviews Dr. Jonathan Rynhold.

Other content 
In addition to featuring its journal articles, videos, and transcripts from the Capitol Hill Conferences, the MEPC web site houses various book reviews and essays written by scholars and members of the MEPC board. The council also shares a recurring feature series, Middle East In Focus, that provides a synopsis of news and commentary from Middle Eastern and other international media. This survey complements a digest of timely articles from the region also available on the web site. In 2011, Senior fellow Mark N. Katz contributed a weekly series, The War on Terror in Perspective, where he addressed "the regional impact of American withdrawal from Iraq and Afghanistan, U.S. policy choices after withdrawing from these conflicts, and the broader geopolitical context in which 'war' takes place." Political risk analyst Ian Siperco has also contributed articles regarding political developments in the region.

Funding

In expressing alarm over former MEPC president Chas Freeman's nomination to the National Intelligence Council (NIC) in early 2009, Weekly Standard contributing editor Michael Goldfarb claimed that MEPC funds from Saudi Arabia were for "the funding of a Saudi lobby that could widen the range of debate, i.e. counter the Israel lobby."  Mr. Goldfarb's phrase "Saudi lobby" referred to an article by Washington Times writer Eli Lake where he wrote that "Since 1997, Mr. Freeman has been president of the Middle East Policy Council (MEPC), a Washington think tank. In 2007, he accepted a $1 million donation from Prince Alwaleed bin Talal bin Abdulaziz al-Saud that, according to a press release at the time, was meant for "future projects" for the council."  Mr. Lake went on to write that "In an interview in 2006 with the Saudi-U.S. Relations Information Service, Mr. Freeman said, 'These are obviously very difficult times for any organization attempting to promote better understanding and stronger ties between the United States and the Arab world. Attitudes are extremely negative.  Financial support has been very negatively affected both by the deterioration in the atmosphere [and] the sense on the part of many of our Arab donors that nothing can be done to fix the negative image of the Arabs in the United States at present.'  The interview was publicized in 2009 on the blog of a former foreign policy director of the American Israel Public Affairs Committee, Steve J. Rosen."

According to non-profit disclosure forms, The Middle East Policy Council's 2007 total receipts were $731,000.

Membership 

 Former President, In Memoriam - The Hon. Ford M. Fraker, Former Ambassador, Saudi Arabia; Former Senior Adviser, Kohlberg, Kravis, Roberts & Co.

President and Chairman - Hon. Richard J. Schmierer, Former Ambassador, Oman

 Member - Ms. Karen Koning AbuZayd, Former Under-Secretary-General of the United Nations
 Member - Ms. Bassima Alghussein, Former Alghussein Global Strategies
 Member - Dr. Janet Breslin-Smith, Former Deputy Staff Director, Senate Agriculture Committee
 President Emeritus and Member - The Hon. Chas W. Freeman Jr., Chairman, Projects International; Former Assistant Secretary of Defense; Former Ambassador, Saudi Arabia; Former President, Middle East Policy Council
 Member - Ms. Anne Joyce, Editor, Middle East Policy
 Member - Dr. Philip Mattar, President, Rittenhouse Investments
 Member - The Hon. James P. Moran, Former Congressman, VA-8
 Member - The Hon. Ronald E. Neumann, President, American Academy of Diplomacy; Former Ambassador Algeria, Bahrain and Afghanistan
 Member - The Hon. William A. Rugh, Former President, AMIDEAST; Former Ambassador, U.A.E. and Yemen
 Member - The Hon. James B. Smith, Former Ambassador, Saudi Arabia
 Member - The Hon. Patrick Theros, Former Ambassador, Qatar
 Member - Mr. Tom Walter, Former President, ExxonMobil Saudi Arabia

 Chairman Emeritus - Dr. Omar Kader, Chairman and CEO, Paltech

References

External links
MEPC - Homepage
 TeachMideast - Homepage

501(c)(3) organizations
Foreign policy and strategy think tanks in the United States
Middle Eastern studies in the United States
United States–Middle Eastern relations
1981 establishments in Washington, D.C.
Think tanks established in 1981